The Nur ul-Ihsan Mosque was, until 2018, the oldest mosque in Phnom Penh, the capital of  Cambodia. It was situated 7 km north of the centre of the city.

It was built in 1813 by the Cham community. It survived the Khmer rouge regime which transformed it into a pigsty.

In 2018 it has been destroyed and replaced by a mosque called the KM7 Mosque, a Middle Eastern design financed by a donation from Kuwait.

References

Mosques in Phnom Penh
Religious buildings and structures completed in 1813
Mosques completed in 1813